Carcanet Press is a publisher, primarily of poetry, based in the United Kingdom and founded in 1969 by Michael Schmidt.

In 2000 it was named the Sunday Times millennium Small Publisher of the Year.

History
Carcanet was originally a literary magazine, founded in 1962. Michael Hind, a member of the original editorial board, recalls how the idea was to 'collect together and publish as a periodical poetry, short fiction, and "intelligent criticism of all the arts"; there were to be both student and senior members' contributions.' The intention was to link Oxford and Cambridge universities.  Its name is an English word which means "a collar of jewels", diminutive of "carcan" (an obsolete word for a collar used for punishment), pronounced "kar'ka-net". (A much earlier use of the word was in The Carcanet, an anthology published in 1828.)

The magazine Carcanet had fallen on hard times by October 1967 when Michael Schmidt, a newly arrived undergraduate at Wadham College, Oxford, took it over. In 1969 as a swansong the magazine produced a few pamphlets: poetry by new writers from Britain, India and the United States, and a book of translations. The reviews were encouraging, and in 1970–71 Carcanet Press became a limited company, leaving South Hinksey, Oxford, for Manchester.

Carcanet enjoys Arts Council England support. Its list includes, alongside new writers from all over the world, major authors from the twentieth and earlier centuries.

Location
Carcanet was conceived at Pin Farm, South Hinksey, Oxford, in 1969 by Peter Jones, Gareth Reeves and Michael Schmidt, and Grevel Lindop was instrumental in suggesting the Fyfield Books series. In 1971, when Michael Schmidt was appointed Gulbenkian Writing Fellow at the University of Manchester, Carcanet moved to 266 Councillor Lane, Cheadle Hulme, Cheshire, and in 1975 it came of age, taking a tiny suite of offices in the Corn Exchange, Manchester. However, the 1996 Manchester bombing impacted heavily on the workings of Carcanet Press, forcing it to move to temporary offices in Manchester House, Princess Street, and then across the river Irwell to Blackfriars Street, Salford, where it stayed for six years before moving back into the centre of Manchester. It now resides in Cross Street.

Imprints 
Besides the main poetry list, Carcanet is also home to a diverse set of imprints:

The Oxford Poets imprint, formerly the poetry list of Oxford University Press, was established in March 1999. The Fyfield Books imprint includes selections from the great European and American classics from ancient to modern times. Carcanet also publish a range of inventive fiction and literary criticism alongside the Lives and Letters series and the Aspects of Portugal imprint.

Carcanet issues the literary magazine PN Review, which appears six times a year.

See also
David C. Ward
Michael Schmidt

References

External links 
 Official Carcanet website
 Carcanet Press Archive; John Rylands Library

Book publishing companies of the United Kingdom
Poetry publishers
Publishing companies established in 1969